Vernon Staley (1852–1933) was an English Anglican priest, writer, and liturgist who was known for his Anglo-Catholic views. He was the author of The Catholic Religion: A Manual of Instruction for Members of the Anglican Communion, first published in 1893. By 1908 15 editions of this book had been published. Staley was born in Rochdale, Lancashire and trained for the ministry at Chichester Theological College. In 1901 he was appointed provost of St. Andrew's Cathedral, Inverness, where he served for ten years before moving to Ickford, Buckinghamshire where he was rector of St. Nicholas church until his death.

References 

 Irvine, Christopher (ed.) (1998). They Shaped Our Worship: Essays on Anglican Liturgists, Society for Promoting Christian Knowledge

External links
Bibliographic directory from Project Canterbury

1852 births
1933 deaths
19th-century English Anglican priests
20th-century English Anglican priests
Anglican liturgists
Anglo-Catholic clergy
Anglo-Catholic writers
English Anglo-Catholics